William Tadlowe (by 1495 – 1556), of New Romney, Kent, was an English politician.

He was a Member of Parliament (MP) for New Romney in 1539, 1542, 1547 and October 1553. He was also bailiff, chamberlain, and jurat to New Romney, and bailiff to Yarmouth.

References

15th-century births
1556 deaths
Members of Parliament for New Romney
English MPs 1539–1540
English MPs 1542–1544
English MPs 1547–1552
English MPs 1553 (Mary I)
Bailiffs
Chamberlains
Jurats